James Richard Cowell (28 May 1885 – 6 December 1956) was an Australian rules footballer who played with St Kilda and Melbourne in the Victorian Football League (VFL). In 1919, he was cleared to coach Camberwell in the Victorian Football Association (VFA).

Notes

External links 

 

1885 births
1956 deaths
Australian rules footballers from Melbourne
St Kilda Football Club players
Melbourne Football Club players
Camberwell Football Club coaches
People from Heidelberg, Victoria